Chinese folk religion plays a dynamic role in the lives of the overseas Chinese who have settled in the countries of this geographic region, particularly Burmese Chinese, Singaporean Chinese, Malaysian Chinese, Thai Chinese and Hoa. The Indonesian Chinese, by contrast, were forced to adopt en masse either Buddhism or Christianity in the 1950s and 1960s, abandoning traditional worship, due to Indonesia's religious policies which at the time forbade Chinese traditional religion or did not recognize it as a "religion" thus making it vulnerable to discrimination. Some Chinese Filipinos also still practice some Chinese traditional religions, besides Christianity of either Roman Catholicism or Protestantism, of which some have also varyingly syncretized traditional Chinese religious practices with. Chinese folk religion, the ethnic religion of Han Chinese, "Shenism" was especially coined referring to its Southeast Asian expression; another Southeast Asian name for the religion is the Sanskrit expression Satya Dharma (literally "Truth Law"). 

The Chinese folk religion of Southeast Asia, is markedly typified by the interaction with Malay indigenous religions (Malaysian and Indonesian folk religion), the adoption of gods of Hindu derivation, such as Brahma, Ganesha and Hanuman, and also syncretism with Christianity in the Philippines. The philosophical forms of Confucianism and Taoism are followed, and organised forms of the Chinese folk faith, such as the Church of Virtue, Yiguandao and Zhenkongism, have taken significant foothold among Southeast Asian Chinese.

In Singapore about 11% of the total population is Taoist, composed by a 14.4% of the Chinese Singaporeans identifying as Taoists. In Malaysia, around 10% of Chinese Malaysians practice Chinese folk religions, corresponding to around 1% of the whole country population. However, numbers may be significantly larger since many folk religious Chinese register as "Buddhists" for census purposes. In Indonesia, Taosu Agung Kusumo, leader of the Majelis Agama Tao Indonesia, claims there are 5 million Taoist followers in the country as of 2009.

By country

Indonesia

The Chinese folk religion of the Chinese Indonesians is named "Confucianism" or "Satya Dharma", and Chinese temples are called klenteng or vihara in Indonesian language. It is officially recognised by the government as Agama Khonghucu or Religion of Confucius, which was chosen because of the political condition in Indonesia before the end of Suharto rule in 1998, who had forbidden all forms of Chinese religions and Indonesian Chinese could only embraced the five officially recognised religions, many of them eventually convert to Buddhism or Christianity. The Chinese Indonesians had their culture and religious rights restored only after the fourth president of Indonesia, Abdurrahman Wahid, issued a regulation that recognised "Confucianism" among the legal religions of the country. He said that:

The first precept of Pancasila (the Five Basic Principles of the Indonesian state) stipulates belief in the one and only God. The Confucian philosophy is able to fulfill this, for Confucius mentioned only one God in his teaching, the Heaven or Shangdi. The Heaven possess the characteristic of Yuan Heng Li Zhen, or Omnipresent, Omnipotent, Omnibenevolent, Just.
The Master said, "Great indeed was Yao as a sovereign! How majestic was he! It is only Heaven that is grand, and only Yao corresponded to it. How vast was his virtue! The people could find no name for it. How majestic was he in the works which he accomplished! How glorious in the elegant regulations which he instituted!" (VIII, xix, tr. Legge 1893:214)

Another movement in Indonesia is the Tridharma (Sanskrit: "law of the three"), syncretising elements of different religions, the Chinese three teachings amongst others. After the fall of Suharto rule it is undergoing a process of systematisation of doctrines and rituals. Tridharma temples always consist of three main rooms: the front room for Tian or God, the middle for the main deity of the temple, the back room for the Founders of three religions and their pantheon: Confucius, Laozi, and Buddha. Several big Chinese population cities like Medan, Batam, Bagansiapiapi and Singkawang has a significant numbers of Chinese folk religion followers aside Buddhists. There are also many Taoist associations in Indonesia.

Some local deities which are not known outside Indonesia includes Tan Hu Cin Jin from Banyuwangi-Bali, Tan Tik Siu from Tulungagung, Tan Oei Ji Sian Seng or Gi Yong Kong from Rembang-Lasem, and Tey Hai Cin Jin whose worshiped on the coastal cities of East and Middle Java.

Malaysia

In Malaysia the Malaysian Chinese constitute a large segment of the population, mostly adherent of Mahayana Buddhism. The Chinese traditional religion has a relatively significant registered following in the states of Sarawak (6%) and Penang (5%). Many other folk religious Chinese register as "Buddhists" in government surveys. Chinese temples are called tokong in Malaysian language.

The Chinese folk religion was brought into Malaysia by Chinese emigrants in the 15th century, with small settlements and Temple that were established in Malacca by Hokkien traders, but it was not until the 19th century that there was a mass migration of Chinese. They built temples dedicated to their Deities, schools and cemeteries for those who died. The Chinese migration during the tin and gold mining days, which were a result of high demand for these products, prompted the need of temples, for practices and religious rituals.

Clan organisations in the Chinese immigrant society were important, where surnames, dialect, locality and trade mattered. The Cantonese, Hokkien, Teochew and Hakka, respectively formed their lineage associations and Kongsi, such as the Khoo Kongsi and Eng Chuan Tong Tan Kongsi, and they are the grassroots support of Chinese overseas communities.

A prominent cult is that of Tua Pek Kong ( Dabo Gong), and it has incorporated the cult of the Na Tuk Kong ( Nadu Gong) and Datuk Keramat of local Malay origin. Other native and Thai Deities have been incorporated into the pantheon.

Thailand
Thailand has a large population of Thai Chinese, people of Chinese or partial Chinese origin (up to 14% of the population of the country). Most of those who follow Buddhism have been integrated into the Theravada Buddhist tradition of the country, with only a negligible minority still practicing Chinese Buddhism. However, many others have retained the Chinese folk religions and Taoism. Despite the large number of followers and temples, and although they are practiced freely, these religions have no state recognition, their temples are not counted as places of worship, and their followers are counted as "Theravada Buddhists" in officially released religious figures. In Thailand, Chinese temples are called sanchao.

Like in other Southeast Asian countries, the Chinese folk religion of Thailand has developed local features, including the worship of local gods. Major Chinese festivals such as the Nian, Zhongqiu and Qingming are widely celebrated especially in Bangkok, Phuket, and other parts of Thailand where there are large Chinese populations.

The Chinese in the city of Phuket are noted for their nine-day vegetarian festival between September and October. During the festive season, devotees will abstain from meat and mortification of the flesh by Chinese mediums are also commonly seen, along with rites devoted to the worship of Tua Pek Kong. Such traditions were developed during the 19th century in Phuket by the local Chinese with influences from Thai culture.

Singapore

Sizeable number of Chinese Singaporeans practice Taoism, which in the city state is used as a synecdoche for broader Chinese folk religion. Taoists in Singapore worship many Deities, that frequently are embodied by historical ancestors and are subject to a complex Taoist hierarchy of veneration. They also worship some deities of common origins, notably the Jade Emperor, Xuan Tian Shang Di, Lord Guan, and Tian Shang Sheng Mu. Other deities that were venerated and frequently keep at home as auspicious images include the Fu, Lu, and Shou. Caishen is also popularly venerated by many Chinese businessmen. However, certain deities are worshipped by a particular dialect group, and may not share a common devotion with other Chinese dialect groups. One interesting example will be Qing Shui Zhu Shi(祖師公), this particular Deity is mainly worshipped by the Hokkien, particularly from Anxi Clan. Buddhist Bodhisattvas like Guanyin or Di Zang Wang are popularly worshipped in Singapore. Deities from other ethnicity, like Na Tuk Kong (拿督公) or Datuk Keramat are also venerated.

Adherents of Taoism or Chinese Folk Religionists would placed their main altars/shrines inside their living room. This is more often seen among Chinese families, rather than individuals. The main Gods/Deities would be enshrined at the centre of the top altar, and a tablet dedicated to the Guardians of Earth/Dizhushen (地主神) would be placed at the bottom altar. Ancestral tablets are usually placed beside the statues/images of the main Gods/Deities at the top altar. Often, an incense burner to burn incense sticks is placed in front of the Gods/Deities and a separate smaller incense burner will be placed in front of the ancestral tablet. Oil lamps may also be placed at altars, and fruit or flower offerings are also placed in front of the Gods/Deities as offerings. Some families may also have an altar dedicated to the Kitchen God (灶君) inside the kitchen. 

They will usually installed a small altar/shrine, painted red and gold, with the words "Heaven Official Bestows Blessings" (天官赐福) written on it outside the house or simply a small incense burner filled with ash where incense sticks are placed. This is dedicated to Tian Kong (天公)/Jade Emperor (玉皇大帝) and is the first altar that they will worship. After they have worship toward the Heaven representing Tian Kong/Jade Emperor, they will proceed to worship at the main altar to the Gods/Deities, then to the ancestral tablets and eventually to the Guardians of Earth/Dizhushen. The smoke emitted from burning incense sticks symbolize their devotion and prayer, and at times requests, to the Gods/Deities.

Philippines 

A small number of Chinese Filipinos (2%) continue to practise traditional Chinese religions solely. Mahayana Buddhism, specifically Chinese Pure Land Buddhism, Taoism, and ancestral worship (including Confucianism) are the traditional Chinese beliefs that continue to have adherents among Chinese Filipinos.

Buddhist and Taoist temples can be found where Chinese Filipinos live, especially in urban areas like Metro Manila. For example, Mazu / Ma-cho is sometimes known or identified as "Our Lady of Caysasay", which is also an emanation of the Blessed Virgin Mary. Both are considered emanations of each other, with the images of Our Lady of Antipolo and Our Lady of the Abandoned as additional emanations, as all four are related to water and/or travel. Additionally, Guan Yu is also sometimes known among Chinese Filipinos as "Santo Santiago" (St. James) or in Hokkien as "Te Ya Kong" (Hokkien ) or "Kuan Kong" (Hokkien ). Chinese Filipinos also established indigenous religious denominations like Bell Church (钟教), which is a syncretic religion with ecumenical and interfaith in orientation. There are several prominent Chinese temples like Seng Guan Temple (Buddhist) in Manila, Ma-Cho Temple (Mazu worship) in San Fernando, La Union, Cebu Taoist Temple in Cebu City, Lon Wa Buddhist Temple in Davao City, and many more distributed around the country.

Around half (40%) of all Filipino Chinese regardless of religion still claim to practise ancestral worship. Chinese Filipinos, especially the older generations, have the tendency to go to pay respects to their deceased ancestors at least once a year, either by going to the temple, or going to the local Chinese cemetery or traditional burial grounds, such as the Manila Chinese Cemetery for those in Metro Manila, often burning candles, incense and joss paper money, presenting offerings like certain fruits or fruit juice tetra packs to the deceased and decorating the tombstones, mausoleums, and ancestral tablets with joss paper. Chinese Filipino mausoleums or burial grounds also frequently have altars for Houtu (后土), where candles and incense are also lit.

Since most Chinese Filipinos practice Christianity, such as Catholicism or Protestantism, there is also a unique religious syncretism that is found in many Chinese FIlipino homes. For Catholic Chinese Filipinos, some have altars bearing Catholic images such as the Santo Niño (Child Jesus) as well as statues of the Buddha and Taoist gods or other deities like the Three Deities in their homes, often decorated with Sampaguita garlands. It is not unheard of to venerate the Blessed Virgin Mary using joss sticks (Tao And buddhist Incense Sticks.) and otherwise traditional offerings, much as one would have done for Guan Yin or Mazu. In general for both Catholic or Protestant Christian Chinese Filipinos, it is normal in many households to have traditional Chinese statues and figurines like the Fat Buddha, the Three Deities, the Lucky Fu(福) Cat, the Money Frog, Chinese couplets, or other such traditional Chinese paraphernalia for the purposes of inviting good fortune, luck, and prosperity, while at the same time praying to God and conducting Bible study in the same household or room while also having Christian symbols, Bible verses, and other such Catholic or Protestant Christian paraphernalia posted around the household.

Vietnam

Many Vietnamese people and Hoa people (Han Chinese of Vietnam) practice Chinese folk religion, Buddhism and Vietnamese folk religion syncretically.

Features

Organised traditions

Some organised sects stemming from Chinese practises have been active among Southeast Asian Chinese. They include especially De jiao ("religion of virtue"), Zhenkong jiao ("Teachings of True Emptiness") and Yiguandao ("Consistent Way").

Southeast Asian Chinese pantheon
The names of the gods are in transcribed Mandarin or certain Chinese dialects spoken by Southeast Asian Chinese populations:

 Thin Kong (天公) "Lord of Heaven" also known as the Jade Emperor 
 Xuan Tian Shang Di (玄天上帝) or Siong Teh Gong (上帝公), Powerful Deity and was known as the Patron Deity of Ming Dynasty
 Hou Tu (后土) or Di Mu Niang Niang (地母娘娘), known as Goddess Queen of the Earth
 Xi Wang Mu (西王母), an ancient deity and was highly honored
 Dou Mu Yuan Jun (斗母元君), Mother Goddess of the Big Dipper or Lady Mother of the Chariot
 Kew Ong Yah (九皇爷), Nine Emperor Gods who symbolized the nine stars of the Big Dipper, was known in Malay as "Perayaan Dewa Sembilan Maharaja"
 Guan Teh Gong (關帝公) or Guan Sheng Di Jun (關聖帝君) or "Lord Guan" - God of Military, Symbol of Righteousness and Justice, Patron Deity of police, businessmen and secret societies
 Kuan Yim Pu Chor (觀音佛祖) or also known as Avalokiteśvara - Goddess of Mercy or Bodhisattva of Compassion
 Jiu Tian Xuan Nü (九天玄女)  Lady of the Nine Heavens, an ancient Deity and also worshipped as Goddess of War
 Ma Zu (媽祖) or Tian Shang Sheng Mu (天上圣母), Goddess of the sea, Patron Deity of fishermen, sailors and any occupations related to sea/ocean, also regarded as Patron Deity for Lim (林) Clan 
 Ong Yah Gong (王爺信仰), Divine Emissaries (代天巡狩) who tour the world of the living on behalf of the Jade Emperor, expelling disease and evil
 Qing Shui Zhu Shi (清水祖師) or Cho Su Gong (祖師公), Patron Deity of Anxi County in Quanzhou
 Bao Sheng Da Di (保生大帝), Patron Deity of Tong'an District in Xiamen, also worshipped as a Medicinal Deity
 Guang Ze Zun Wang (廣澤尊王), Honorific King of Great Compassion, Patron Deity of Nan'an City in Quanzhou
 Kai Zhang Sheng Wang (開漳聖王), Patron Deity of Zhangzhou
 Tua Pek Kong (大伯公) or Fu De Zheng Shen (福德正神)
 Hua Tuo (華佗), was regarded as "divine physician" in Chinese history and worshipped as a Medicinal Deity
 Qi Tian Da Sheng (齊天大聖) or Dai Seng Yah (大聖爺), the popular and powerful Monkey God
 Seng Ong Yah (城隍爺), Patron Deity of City or City God
 Choy Sun Yeh (财神 "Wealth God")
 Wen Chang Di Jun (文昌帝君), God of Culture and Literature, Patron Deity of scholars and students
 Zhu Sheng Niang Niang (註生娘娘), Goddess of fertility and children
 Yue Xia Lao Ren (月下老人), Patron Deity of marriage and love 
 He-He Er Xian (和合二仙), Immortals of Harmony and Union, associated with happy marriages
 Hua Gong Hua Po (花公花婆) Patron Deities and Protector of children
 Tai Yang Xing Jun (太陽星君) Sun God
 Tai Yin Niang Niang (太陰娘娘) or Chang Er (嫦娥), Moon Goddess, worshipped by female devotees during Mid-Autumn Festival
 Tai Sui (太歲) 60 Heavenly Officials who will be in charge of each year during the Chinese sixty years cycle
 Fu, Lu, and Shou (福祿壽), Three deities of stars representing auspicious, good life and longevity. 
 Wu Ying Jiang Jun (五營將軍 The Celestial Generals of Five Directions) 
 Teh Choo Kong (地主公) "Earth Lord" or Di Zhu Shen (地主神) "God of the Purified Place"
 Ho Yah Gong (虎爺公) "Tiger Deity" who guard the temples and was worshipped for protection against bad luck, dangers and enemies
 Zao Jun (灶君), Kitchen God and also known as the Stove God
 Men Shen (門神), Divine Guardians of doors and gates
 Tua Li Yah Pek (大二爺伯), Underworld Deities who are in charge of escorting or arresting the spirits of the dead, also been highly regarded for their brotherhood spirit 
 Gu Tao Baey Bin (牛頭馬面), Guardians of the Underworld
 Jin Qian Bo (金錢伯), Popularly known in English as Uncle Moneybags, who oversees incense money transmission from the living realm to the realm of the dead (Underworld)
 She Mian Shen (四面神), also known as Four Faced Deity, who is also known as Brahma
 Na Tuk Kong (拿督公), also as Dato Gong or Datuk Gong, related to Datuk Keramat in Malaysian folk religion

Places of worship and practice

Chinese temples in Indonesia and Malaysia are called kelenteng, klenteng, tokong or pekong in local Malay languages, or alternatively bio, the southern Chinese pronunciation of Mandarin miao. In Thailand their name is sanchao. Items for Chinese religious practices in Southeast Asia are supplied at shén liào shāngdiàn (神料商店 "shops of goods for the gods").

See also

 Chinese folk religion
 Nine Emperor Gods Festival
 Birthday of the Monkey God
 Ancestor worship (Ancestral halls & Ancestral tablet)
 List of Mazu temples (Baishatun Mazu Pilgrimage & Tin Hau temples in Hong Kong)
 Kwan Tai temples in Hong Kong & Hip Tin temples in Hong Kong
 List of City God Temples in China
 Chinese temples in Kolkata
 Bell Church & Bell Church (temple)
 Chow Yam-nam (White Dragon King)
 Vietnamese folk religion
 Malaysian folk religion
 Burmese folk religion
 Tai folk religion
 Diwata

Notes

References

Further reading

External links
 Deism of Malaysian Chinese
 Zhenkong way—Zhenkong religion 

Chinese diaspora in Southeast Asia
Chinese folk religion in Asia
Religion in Southeast Asia